Rowing (Spanish:Remo), for the 2013 Bolivarian Games, took place from 22 November to 24 November 2013.

Medal table
Key:

Medal summary

Men

Women

References

Events at the 2013 Bolivarian Games
Bolivarian Games
2013 Bolivarian Games